The National People's Congress Agriculture and Rural Affairs Committee is one of nine special committees of the National People's Congress, the national legislature of the People's Republic of China. The special committee was created during the first session of the 9th National People's Congress in March 1998, and has existed for every National People's Congress since.

Membership

References

Agriculture and Rural Affairs Committee